William B. Smiley (1856 in Baltimore, Maryland – July 11, 1884 in Baltimore, Maryland) was a professional baseball player who primarily played second base in the American Association for the St. Louis Brown Stockings and the Baltimore Orioles for one season in 1882.

External links

1856 births
1884 deaths
Baltimore Canaries players
St. Louis Brown Stockings (AA) players
Baltimore Orioles (AA) players
Major League Baseball second basemen
Baseball players from Baltimore
Erie (minor league baseball) players
Winona Clipper players
Buffalo (minor league baseball) players
Binghamton Crickets (1870s) players
Lynn Live Oaks players
Worcester (minor league baseball) players
Capital City of Albany players
Rochester Hop Bitters players
Baltimore (minor league baseball) players
Rochester (minor league baseball) players
Brooklyn Atlantics (minor league) players
Washington Nationals (minor league) players
Albany (minor league baseball) players
Wilmington Quicksteps (minor league) players
Richmond Virginias players
19th-century baseball players